The USSR State Prize was the Soviet Union's state honor. 
It was established on 9 September 1966. After the dissolution of the Soviet Union, the prize was followed up by the State Prize of the Russian Federation.

Recipients of the State Prize in science and engineering by year

1967 

 Vladimir Chelomei: missile design

1968 

 Pavel Solovyov: engines design
 Birutė Kasperavičienė, Bronislovas Krūminis, Vaclovas Zubras, Ṧmuelis Liubeckis: for the design of the residential microdistrict Žirmūnai
 Dmitri Lyudvigovich Tomashevich for the design of the 3M7 Drakon

1969 

 Lev Korolyov: computer science
 Evgeny Abramyan: nuclear physics
 Nikolai Ryzhkov: future Soviet premier
 Alexander Yanshin

1970 

 Dmitrii Evgenievich Okhotsimsky: space scientist
 Alexander Yakovlevich Bereznyak: for missile design (KSR-5 and Kh-28)
 Vladimir Polukhin: optics
 Ali Guliyev: chemistry

1971 

 Alexander Yakovlevich Bereznyak: for missile design (Kh-22M)
 Sergey Ilyushin: aeronautical engineering

1972 

 Andrey Kapitsa: geographer

1973 

 The developer of the KT315 transistor
 Moshe Sneideris: medical xeroradiography

1974 

 Olga Avilova: surgeon
 Boris Babaian
 Vladimir Chelomei: for missile design

1975 

 Igor Sergeevich Seleznev: for missile design (Kh-22MA)
 Sergei Vonsovsky: physics

1976 

 Arseny Mironov: for flight testing and introduction into service the Su-24 tactical bomber
 Igor Novozhilov: Russian-Karelian physicist and mathematician

1977 

 Pavel Alekseyevich Cherenkov: physics
 Yuri Valentinovich Knorozov: linguistic research
 Igor Sergeevich Seleznev: for missile design (KSR-5P)
 Alexander Sergeyevich Yakovlev: aeronautical engineering

1979 

 Nikolai Ryzhkov, future Soviet premier
 Arkady Ostashev: scientist, participant in the launch of the first artificial Earth satellite and the first cosmonaut

1980 

 Grigory Eisenberg
 Viktor Kremenuk, Institute for US and Canadian Studies (ISKRAN)

1981 

 Valentin Panteleimonovich Smirnov
 Fedor Andreevich Kuznetsov: materials science
 Evgeny Michailovich Zemskov
 Vera Faddeeva: computational science

1982 

 Alexei Abrikosov: physics
 Vladimir Chelomei: missile design
 Sergei Chudinov: physics
 Sergei Vonsovsky: physics
 Nicolai Brandt: physics
 Vladimir Ivanov-Omsky: physics
 Victor Ogorodnikov: physics
 : physics
 Victor A. Brumberg: physics

1983 

 Igor Spassky

1984 

 Zhores Alferov: physics
 Nikolay Bogolyubov: physics
 Igor Sergeevich Seleznev: missile design (Kh-59)
 Ilia Vekua
 Yuri Yu. Gleba: biology
  ??? (for project 877 Varshavyanka submarine)
 Algis Petras Piskarskas: nonlinear optics
 Eugen Doga: composer

1985 

 Anatoliy O. Morozov: for the "Ulianovsk" flexible manufacturing system
 Feodor Ivanovich Vilesov, Volodymyr Nemoshkalenko: for the development of the method of photoelectron spectroscopy and its application in science and technology

1986 

 Ahliman Amiraslanov: oncologist
 Gennady Leonov: mathematics

1987 

 Nail H. Ibragimov: mathematics
 Alexander Nadiradze: missile design
 Dimitri Donskoy: for work on nonlinear acoustics

1988 

 : physics
 Gregory Pikus: physics
Ruslan Stratonovich: mathematics

1989 

 Nikolay Basov: physics
 Alexei Fridman, Nikolai Gor'kavyi: science and technology, for predicting of a system of new satellites of Uranus based on developed theory of collective and collisional processes in planetary rings.

Recipients of the State Prize in literature and arts by year

1967 

 Anatoly Polyansky, D.S.Vitukhin, Yu.V.Ratskevich, etc.: architecture, for "Pribrezhny" complex of Artek
 Sergei Yutkevich and Yevgeni Gabrilovich: for the film Lenin in Poland
 Vytautas Žalakevičius, Donatas Banionis, and Jonas Gricius: for the film Nobody Wanted to Die

1968 

 Mark Donskoy: for the film A Mother's Heart
 Tahir Salahov: painter and draughtsman; for the portrait of composer Gara Garayev

1970 

 Stanislav Rostotsky, Boris Dulenkov, Vyacheslav Shumsky, Nina Menshikova, Georgi Polonsky, and Vyacheslav Tikhonov: for the film We'll Live Till Monday

1971 

 Aleksandr Tvardovsky: literature
 Sergei Gerasimov, Vladimir Rapoport, Pyotr Galadzhev, Oleg Zhakov, Vasily Shukshin, and Natalya Belokhvostikova: for the film By the Lake

1974 

 Qaysin Quli: literature
 Boris Buneev: film

1976 

 Sergey Mikaelyan: film
 Alexander Isaakovich Gelman: film
 Gevorg Emin: literature
 Dmitri Anosov: science
 Valentin Zorin: television documentaries

1977 

 Mikael Tariverdiev

1978 

 Andrey Voznenesensky
 Evgeny Belyaev: music, tenor soloist
 Tokay Mammadov: sculptor

1979 

 Yuri Norstein: arts

1980 

 Omar Eldarov: sculptor; for monument-ensemble to Sadriddin Ayni in Dushanbe

1981 

 Vladimir Shainsky
 Boris Shtokolov
 Shafiga Mammadova: cinema and theatre actress; for Gulya's role in Interrogation film
 Rustam Ibragimbekov: screenwriter, dramatist and producer; for the screenplay Interrogation (1979)

1982 
 Rostislav Grigor'yevich Boyko, composer

1983 

 Yevgeni Gabrilovich, Sergei Yutkevich, Nikolai Nemolyayev, and Lyudmila Kusakova: for the film Lenin in Paris
 Valery Gavrilin: for the Choral Symphony

1984 

 Bakhtiyar Vahabzadeh: literature

1985 

 Arkady Khait (screenwriter), Anatoli Reznikov (director), Vyacheslav Nazaruk (artist): for animated cartoon series Leopold the Cat (category "Works of literature and arts for children")

1986 

 Levonid Yakovlev
 Aleksei Losev: for his History of Classical Aesthetics

1987 

 Vladimir Kobekin
 Kostas Smoriginas: theatre

1988 

 Vladimir Dudintsev
 Dmitri Pokrovsky

1991 

 Bulat Okudzhava

References

USSR State Prize
Soviet Union-related lists